This is a list of ministers of Kenya.

These Ministers were appointed into the office by the Presidents that have served in Kenya since Kenya's gained independence in 1963. Although the first three Presidents appointed ministers and having them assume their roles immediately, Kenya's new constitution 2010 introduced the vetting of the Appointed Ministers by the Parliament before being confirmed into their posts.

The following are the Ministers/Cabinet Secretaries since 1963 and their respective Dockets:

Office of the Prime Minister

Prime Minister of Kenya
 Jomo Kenyatta (1963–1964) 
 Raila Amolo Odinga (2008–2013)

Deputy Prime Minister of Kenya
 Wycliffe Musalia Mudavadi (2008–2013) 
 Uhuru Kenyatta (2008–2013) (second DPM following the 2008 power sharing agreement between President Mwai Kibaki and Raila Odinga).

Minister of State office of the Prime Minister
 Joseph Murumbi (1963)

Office of the President
In the Office of the President, Ministers of State have been:

Provincial Administration and National Security
 Godfrey Gitahi Kariuki (1978–1982)
 Nahashon Kanyi Waithaka (1990-1992)
 Christopher Murungaru (2003–2005)
 John Michuki (2006–2008)
 George Saitoti (2008-2012)

Defence
 Dr. Njoroge Mungai (1966) 
 1965 Reappointment 
 James Gichuru 1969 - 1982
 Njenga Karume (2006?–2008)
 Mohamed Yusuf Haji (2008 - 2013) 
 Raychelle Omamo (2013 - 2020)
 Monica Juma (2020 - 2021) 
 Eugene Wamalwa (2021 - 2022) 
 Aden Duale (2022 to-date)

Special Programmes
 Naomi Shabaan (2008–2010)
 Abdisalam Eydarus

Minister of State
 Mbiyu Koinange (1966) 
 James Nyamweya (1965) 
 1966 Reappointment

Office of the Vice President

The Vice-President of Kenya office has been held by the following:
 Jaramogi Oginga Odinga (1964–1965)
 Appointed Minister without portfolio  in 1965  –
 Joseph Murumbi (1965–1967)
 Daniel arap Moi (1967–1978)
 Mwai Kibaki (1978–1988)
 Josephat Karanja (1988)
 George Saitoti (1988–1997, 1998–2002)
 Wycliffe Musalia Mudavadi (2002)
 Michael Kijana Wamalwa (2003–2004)
 Moody Awori (2004–2007)
 Kalonzo Musyoka (2007–2012)
 William Ruto (2013–2022)
Rigathi Gachagua (2022—

Home Affairs
In the Office of the Vice President, the Ministry of Home Affairs has had the following Ministers of State:
 Oginga Odinga (1963) 
 Daniel arap Moi (1965) 
 1966 Reappointment 
 Najib Balala

National Heritage
In the Office of the Vice President, the Ministry of National Heritage has had the following Ministers of State:
 William Ole Ntimama

Immigration and Registration of Persons
In the Office of the Vice President, the Ministry of Immigration and Registration of Persons has had the following Ministers of State:
 Otieno Kajwang

External Affairs

Ministry of Foreign Affairs

Ministry of East African and Regional Cooperation
 John Koech
 Amason Kingi Jeffa (2008–2010)

Minister of State (Pan African Affairs)
 Mbiyu Koinange (1963)

Governance and Internal Affairs

Ministry of Justice, National Cohesion and Constitutional Affairs
 Douglas mogere

Ministry of Local Government and Regional Affairs
 Samuel Onyango Ayodo (1963) 
 Lawrence George Sagini (1965) 
 1966 Reappointment

Commerce and Economy

Ministry of Finance

Ministry of Economic Planning and Development
 Tom Mboya (1966) 
 1965 Reappointement

Ministry of Commerce and Industry
 Dr. Julius Gikonyo Kiano (1963) 
 Eliud Ngala Mwendwa (1965)  – Commerce, Industry and Co-operative Development
 Mwai Kibaki (1966) 
 Arthur Magugu (1988-1992) – Ministry of Commerce and Industry
 Francis Masakhalia (1998) – Ministry of Industrial Development
 Mukhisa Kituyi (2003–2007) – Minister for Trade and Industry
 Adan Mohammed (2013-2019) - Industrialization and Enterprise Development
 Peter Munya (2019-2020) - Ministry of Trade and Industrialization
 Betty Maina (2020-2022) - Ministry of Trade and Industrialization
 Moses Kuria (2022 - To Date) - Ministry of Investment, Trade and Industry (MITI)
 Andrew Omanga (Industry)
 Eliud Mwamunga
 Prof. Jonathan Ng'eno

Ministry of Investment, Trade and Industry (MITI) 

 Moses Kuria (2022 - To Date) - Ministry of Investment, Trade and Industry (MITI)
 Abubakar Hassan Abubakar - Principal Secretary  - State Department for Investment Promotion

Ministry of Co-operative Development and Marketing
 Ronald Ngala (1966)  – Co-operatives and Social Services
 Kamwithi Munyi
 Peter Njeru Ndwiga
 Joseph Nyagah

Infrastructure

Ministry of Energy
 Eliud Ngala Mwendwa (1966)  – Power and Communications
 J Nyamweya (1968–1969)- Power and Communications
 Ronald Ngala (1970–1972) – Power and Communications (Deceased)
 Isaac Omolo Okero (1973–1979) – Power and Communications
 Munya Waiyaki (1980)
 J. H. Okwanyo (1981–1982)
 Gilbert Kabere M'mbijiwe (1983)
 Nicholas Biwott (1984–1985) – Energy and Regional Development
 Nicholas Biwott (1990) – Energy
 Darius Msagha Mbela (1996)
 Kirugi Laiboni M’Mukindia (1997)
 Chris Okemo (1998–2000)
 Francis Lotodo (2000)
 Francis Masakhalia (2001)
 Raila Odinga (2001–2002)
 Simeon Nyachae
 Henry Obwocha (2006)
 Kiraitu Murungi
 Charles Keter 2015–present

Ministry of Works
 Dawson Mwanyumba (1963) – Works, Communications and Power
 1965 Reappointment  – Works, Communications and Power
 1966 Reappointment 
 T. K. Mibei (1990) – Public Works
 William Cheruiyot Morogo 2000–2002 – Roads and Public Works

Ministry of Information and Communication
 Achieng Oneko (1963)  – Information, Broadcasting and Tourism
 1965 Reappointment  – Information and Broadcasting
 James Charles Nakhwanga Osogo (1966)  – Information and Broadcasting
 Raphael Tuju
 Mutahi Kagwe
 Samuel Poghisio
 Dr. Fred Okengo Matiangi
 Robert Stanley Matano - Information & Broadcasting
 Joseph Mucheru (2015) - ICT, Innovation and Youth Affairs

Social Services

Ministry of Labour and Human Resource Development
 Eluid Ngala Mwendwa (1963)  – Labour and Social Services
 Dr. Julius Gikonyo Kiano (1965)  – Ministry of Labour
 1966 Reappointment 
 Peter Fredrick Kibisu (1970s –?)James Nyamweya, ouko,okondo,mwangale,titus mbithi,ngutu,balala,mwakwere
 Newton Kulundu (2003–2007)
 Johhn Munyes
 James Orengo
 Kazungu Kambi
 Ukur Yattani (2017-2020)

Ministry of Gender, Sports, Culture and Social Services
 Najib Balala (2002–2003)
 Ochilo Ayacko (2003–2005)
 Maina Kamanda (2005–2007)
 Esther Murugi (2008–2009)
 Naomi Shaaban (2009–2013)
 Rashid Mohammed (2013-2018)
 Amina Mohammed (2018- )

Ministry of Housing and Social Services
 Taaita Toweett (1961) Minister of Labour and Housing 
 Taaita Toweett (1962) Minister of Lands, Survey & Town Planning
 Paul Ngei (1965) 
 Taaita Toweett (1974) Minister of Housing and Social Services

Ministry of Health
 Bernard Mate (1961–1963)
 Dr. Njoroge Mungai (1963)  – Health and Housing
 Joseph David Otiende (1965) 
 1966 Reappointment 
 Samuel Ole Tipis (1963–?)
 Mwai Kibaki (1988–1991)
 Charity Kaluki Ngilu (2003–2007)
(Ministry divided into Ministries of Public Health and Medical Services upon formation of Grand Coalition government)
 Ministry of Public Health (created in 2008)
 Beth Mugo
 Ministry of Medical Services (created 2008)
 Peter Anyang Nyong'o
Cleopa Kilonzo Mailu (2013-2017)
Sicily Kariuki (2018-2020)
Mutahi Kagwe (2020-2022)
Susan Nakhumicha wafula ( 2022–Present)

Ministry of Research,Science and Technology
 Wilson Ndolo Ayah (1987)

Ministry of Education, Science and Technology
 Daniel arap Moi (1962)
 Joseph Daniel Otiende (1963) 
 Jeremiah J.M. Nyagah (1966) 
 Mbiyu Koinange (1965) 
 Taaitta Toweett (1961–1979) Minister for  Labour & Housing and Minister for Education
 Peter Oloo Aringo
 George Saitoti (2003–2006)
 Noah Wekesa (2006–2007?)
(Ministry of Higher Education, Science and Technology created out of ministry of education upon creation of Grand Coalition in 2008)
 Ministry of Education
 William Ruto (2009–2011
Mutula Kilonzo (2012-2013)
Jacob Kaimenyi (2013-2015)
Fred Matiang'i (2016-2017)
 Amina Mohammed (2018)

 George Magoha (2018-2022)

Natural Resource Management

Ministry of Lands and Settlement
 Jackson Angaine (1963)  – Lands and Settlement
 Reappointed in 1965 
 Reappointed in 1966 
 GG Kariuki (1982–1985?)
 Amos M. Kimunya (2002–2006?)
 James Orengo (2008–2012)
 Charity Kaluki Ngilu (2013–2015)
 Farida Karoney (2018–present)

Ministry of Agriculture

Ministry of Environment and Natural Resources
 Lawrence George Sagini (1963)  – Lands, Game, Fisheries, Water and Natural Resources
 Samuel Onyango Ayodo (1965)  – Natural Resources and Tourism
 Argwings Kodhek (1966) 
 William Odongo Omamo (1982)  – Environment and Natural Resources
 Joseph Kamotho (2002)
 Stephen Kalonzo Musyoka
 Kivutha Kibwana
 John Njoroge Michuki (2008-2012)

Ministry of Tourism
 Samuel Onyango Ayodo (1966)  – Tourism and Wildlife
 Karisa Maitha (2002-2004) – Tourism and Wildlife
 Najib Balala
 Peninah Malonza (2022)

Ministry of Livestock and Fisheries Development
  Dr. Appolling Mukasa Mango (1981) 
 Joseph Konzolo Munyao
Charles Murgor Assistant Minister Livestock Development (1981)
 Mohammed Kuti (2008-2013)

See also
 Cabinet of Kenya

References

Ministers
Government of Kenya